The First Freewill Baptist Church is a historic Free Will Baptist church building on Drew Hill Road north of Gilman's Corner Road in East Alton, New Hampshire.  Built in 1826, and essentially unaltered since about 1847, it is a well-preserved example of a rural mid-19th century church.  The building was listed on the National Register of Historic Places in 1978.

Description and history
The First Freewill Baptist Church is located in what is now a rural setting at the geographic center of Alton, on the east side of Drew Hill Road near its junction with Gilman's Corner Road.  It is a single-story wood-frame structure, with a gabled roof, clapboarded exterior, and stone foundation.  Its Greek Revival features include corner pilasters and an entablature, features which are repeated on the first stage of the bell tower, which houses the original period bell.  The interior retains many original features, including gas light fixtures and wall sconces.  Walls are finished at the lower level with wainscoting, which terminates in a simple chair rail.  A simple pulpit is set against the rear wall.  The bulk of the main chamber is taken up by bench pews, from which the doors were removed c. 1847.

The church was in consistent use until 1860, after which many congregants moved to the Baptist church in the present town center.  This area became less important after the 1885 arrival of the railroad at Alton Bay, bypassing the old center.  A community organization was formed to maintain the building in 1920.  It is one of the only buildings to survive from the original town center.

See also
National Register of Historic Places listings in Belknap County, New Hampshire

References

Baptist churches in New Hampshire
Churches on the National Register of Historic Places in New Hampshire
Churches completed in 1826
19th-century Baptist churches in the United States
Churches in Belknap County, New Hampshire
1826 establishments in New Hampshire
National Register of Historic Places in Belknap County, New Hampshire
Alton, New Hampshire
Free Will Baptists